Qabāilistān was a name proposed for a new province in Pakistan which would have contained the areas formerly part of Federally Administered Tribal Areas (FATA). However, the proposal was dropped in favor of merging the tribal areas into the Khyber Pakhtunkhwa province.

See also
Saraikistan, a proposed new province in southern and western Punjab

References

Proposed provinces and territories of Pakistan
Provincial disputes in Pakistan
Regions of Pakistan